Campo Belo is a municipality in the Brazilian state of Minas Gerais.

Campo Belo may also refer to:
 Campo Belo (district of São Paulo)
 Campo Belo (São Paulo Metro), metro station in construction
 Campo Belo do Sul, a municipality in the Brazilian state of Santa Catarina